Cola mossambicensis, the Mozambique cola, is a large evergreen forest tree of the family Malvaceae endemic to central Moçambique and Malawi. As with other Cola species the flowers are carried in clusters on old wood and the seed is released when the mature fruits split longitudinally.

References

 Trees of Southern Africa, K C Palgrave, 1984  

mossambicensis
Flora of Malawi
Flora of Mozambique
Vulnerable flora of Africa